Germán González Blanco (born 14 June 1947) is a Colombian footballer. He competed in the men's tournament at the 1968 Summer Olympics.

References

External links
 

1947 births
Living people
Colombian footballers
Colombia international footballers
Olympic footballers of Colombia
Footballers at the 1968 Summer Olympics
People from Cúcuta
Association football midfielders
Deportivo Cali footballers
Cúcuta Deportivo footballers
20th-century Colombian people
21st-century Colombian people